Korucuk  is a village in the central district (Sinop) of Sinop Province, Turkey. At  it is so close to Sinop that it is about to merge to the city. The population of the village is  2186   as of 2010. A part of Sinop University as well as the bus terminal of Sinop are in Korucuk.

References 

Towns in Turkey
Populated places in Sinop Province
Sinop Central District